The Coalition of the Willing is the 2006 album by drummer Bobby Previte. It combines elements of both jazz and classic rock. Featured artists include Charlie Hunter on guitar, Steve Bernstein on trumpet, Jamie Saft on the Hammond organ and Skerik on saxophone. Although Hunter is mostly known for his unique eight-string guitar work, he uses a regular six-string guitar on the album. Previte toured Europe and North America in support of the album.

Musicians 
 Bobby Previte - Drums & Percussion
 Charlie Hunter - Electric Guitars, Electric Basses
 Steve Bernstein - Trumpet, Slide Trumpet
 Jamie Saft - Organ, Mellotron, Moog, Electric Guitars, Electric Basses
 Skerik - Tenor and Baritone Saxophones
 Stanton Moore - Drums
 Stew Cutler - Harmonica, Slide Guitar

Tracks 
 "The Ministry of Truth" - 5:16
 "Airstrip One" - 4:45
 "Versificator" - 6:09
 "The Ministry of Love" - 5:50
 "Oceania" - 5:07
 "The Inner Party" - 5:56
 "Memory Hole" - 7:54
 "Anthem for Andrea" - 6:09

See also 
The Coalition of the Willing (band)

References

External links 
 Cerebral Rock with Bobby Previte Interview by Robyn Rubinstein, jambase.com, August 3, 2006.

2006 albums
Bobby Previte albums
Avant-garde jazz albums
Jazz fusion albums by American artists
Ropeadope Records albums